In the 2007–08 season the Egyptian Second Division, a professional football league, introduced a new structure consisting of three groups – A, B and C – each consisting of nine teams. One team from each group won promotion to the Egyptian Premier League. These were Petrol Assyut, Ittihad El Shorta, and Olympic.

Clubs

Group A

Talefounat Bani-Sweef
Nel Sohag

Group B

El Shams
El Rebat Wa El Alanwar
Al-Sekka Al-Hadid
Al-Shourta

Group C

Tanta FC
Maleyeit Kafr El Zayiat
Kahroba Talkh
Samanoud
Al-Koroum
El-Mansura Club

References

Egyptian Second Division seasons
2007–08 in Egyptian football
Egypt